Abdul Ali also known as Menu Mia was a Member of the 4th National Assembly of Pakistan as a representative of East Pakistan.

Career
Ali was a Member of the  4th National Assembly of Pakistan from Mymensingh-9 as a candidate of the Muslim League.

References

Pakistani MNAs 1965–1969
Living people
Year of birth missing (living people)
People from Mymensingh District
All Pakistan Muslim League politicians